Ihor Hordya (born 3 April 1988) is a professional Ukrainian footballer midfielder.

He is the product of the Dnipro Dnipropetrovsk Youth school system. Hordya made his debut for senior team only in Ukrainian First League for FC Stal Alchevsk in match 30 August 2009 against FC Naftovyk-Ukrnafta Okhtyrka.

References

External links 
 Profile at Official club site (Rus)
 Profile at Official FFU site (Ukr)
 Profile on Football Squads
 

1988 births
Living people
People from Kremenchuk
Ukrainian footballers
Association football midfielders
Ukrainian expatriate footballers
Expatriate footballers in Belarus
Expatriate footballers in Poland
FC Dnipro players
FC Metalurh Donetsk players
FC Stal Alchevsk players
FC Gomel players
FC Oleksandriya players
FC Cherkashchyna players
FC Kremin Kremenchuk players
MFC Mykolaiv players
FC Kramatorsk players
Universiade gold medalists for Ukraine
Universiade medalists in football
Medalists at the 2007 Summer Universiade
Sportspeople from Poltava Oblast